Christen Nielsen Holberg (a.k.a. Christian Holberg,  1625 – 1686) was an officer in the Norwegian Army. He was also the father of Ludvig Holberg. In 1653 he was hired as a lieutenant to serve with Bergenhusiske Regiment both in Bergenhus len and on Bergenhus Fortress In 1659 he was appointed commander of Sundfjordske Kompani of Bergenhusiske Regiment with the rank of captain. During the Bjelke War he and his company participated in the defence of Halden against the Swedes. On August 2, 1665 he participated in the Battle of Vågen as a Major. In 1672 he was a lieutenant colonel in the Sundfjordske Kompani. In 1675 he was a member of the regimental staff and the commander of Sognske Kompani. During the Gyldenløve War he was given the responsibility of raising two new companies for the regiment before joining it in Sweden in 1676 where he participated in the siege of Bohus Fortress. Upon returning to Norway later that year he was sent back to Bergen to be temporary commander of Bergenhus Fortress in the place of Johan Caspar von Cicignon. In 1679 he left the service of Bergenhusiske Regiment. He died in 1686.

References

Bragstad, Jakob; Fjordane Infanteriregiment nr 10, I gamal og ny tid; 1996; Elanders Forlag; Oslo
Per Gjendem A private page on Ludvig Holberg's anscestry

1625 births
1686 deaths
Norwegian Army personnel
People of the Scanian War
Military personnel of the Anglo-Dutch Wars